is a Japanese manga artist who made his debut in Shōnen Sunday in 1980. He is best known for his manga titled Prefectural Earth Defense Force.

Works
MM Little Morning (MMリトルモーニング/青空にとおく酒浸り)
Prefectural Earth Defense Force
Rikugun Nakano Yobikō (陸軍中野予備校)
Kyonyū Hunter (巨乳ハンター)
Kaitei Junrui Anchovie (海底人類アンチョビー)
Chō Kankaku Analman (超感覚ANALマン)
Kaseijin Deka (火星人刑事)
Eichi Man (エイチマン)
Ganjō Ningen Spartacus (頑丈人間スパルタカス)
Chōjin Totokarucho (超人トトカルチョ, yet to be published in Japan, but has been published in Taiwan and China)
Jitsuroku Jion Taiiku Daigaku (実録ジオン体育大学, yet to be published in Japan, but has been published in Taiwan and China)

External links
Yasunaga Kōichirō @ Comics Page (in Japanese)

Manga artists
Living people
1962 births
People from Ōita Prefecture